The 2011 Categoría Primera A season (officially known at the 2011 Liga Postobón season for sponsorship reasons) is the 64th season of Colombia's top-flight football league.

Format 
The format for both the Apertura and Finalización will have an identical format. Each championship will be divided into four stages. The First Stage will be contested on a home-and-away basis, with each team playing the other teams once and playing a regional rival once more. The top 8 teams after 18 rounds will advance to the quarterfinals. In the quarterfinals, the teams will be matched-up with another team into four different ties. The ties will be contested over two legs on a home-and-away basis. The winner of each tie will advance to the semifinals. The semifinals and the finals will have the same format as the quarterfinals. The winner of the finals will be declared the champion.

Teams

Torneo Apertura
The Liga Postobon I began on February 5 and ended on June 15.

First stage
The First Stage began on February 5 and ended on May 21.

Standings

Results

Knockout round bracket

Quarterfinals
The Quarterfinals began on May 25 and ended on May 31.

Quarterfinal A

Quarterfinal B

Quarterfinal C

Quarterfinal D

Semifinals
The Semifinals began on June 4 and ended on June 8.

Semifinal A

Semifinal B

Finals
The Finals began on June 12 and ended on June 18.

Top goalscorers
Source:

Torneo Finalización 
The Liga Postobon II began on August 27 and is scheduled to end on December 21.

First stage
The First Stage began on August 27 and ended on November 27.

Standings

Results

Quarterfinals 
The Quarterfinals began on December 3 and ended on December 8.

Quarterfinal A

Quarterfinal B

Quarterfinal C

Quarterfinal D

Semifinals 
The Semifinals began on December 11 and ended on December 15.

Semifinal A 

Note: This match was originally scheduled for December 14, but was postponed due to heavy rain.

Semifinal B

Finals

Top goalscorers
Source:

Aggregate table

Relegation
Rules for classification: 1st average; 2nd goal difference; 3rd number of goals scored; 4th away goals scored.

Relegation/promotion playoff
As the second worst team in the relegation table, América played a two-legged tie against Patriotas, the 2011 Categoría Primera B runner-up. As the Primera A team, América played the second leg at home. The winner was determined by points, followed by goal difference, then a penalty shootout. Patriotas won the series in a penalty shootout to relegate América to the Primera B.

References

External links 
  
 Official regulations 

2011
Col
1